U-ka saegusa IN db 1st ~Kimi to Yakusoku Shita Yasashii Ano Basho made~ is the first studio album by Japanese pop-rock band U-ka Saegusa in dB. The album was released on November 19, 2003 under Giza Studio label.

Background
The album includes 4 previously released singles since It's for you till Kimi to Yakusoku Shita Yasashii Ano Basho made. The singles Whenever I think of you and Tears go by weren't released in this album. Ex.member of Japanese electro unit Pamelah, Masazumi Ozawa becomes involved with the album production as arranger. Ex.members of Japanese rock band Rumania Montevideo, Makoto Miyoshi and Kazunobu Mashima appeared in the credits of staff as composers.

Charting performance
The album reached #19 rank in Oricon for first week. It charted for 6 weeks and sold 25,747 copies.

Track listing

Usage in media
The song Kimi to Yakusoku Shita Yasashii Ano Basho made was used as opening theme for Anime television series Detective Conan
The song CHU☆TRUE LOVE was used as theme songs for music program AX MUSIC-TV aired at Nippon TV
The song Shocking Blue was used as ending theme for program Pro no Domyaku aired at Yomiuri TV
The song I can't see, I can't feel was used as theme song for program AX MUSIC-TV aired at Nippon TV

References

2003 debut albums
Being Inc. albums
Giza Studio albums
Japanese-language albums
U-ka Saegusa in dB albums
Albums produced by Daiko Nagato